Robert "Bilbo" Walker Jr. (February 19, 1937 – November 29, 2017) was an American blues musician, who is known in the blues music world due to his "rock 'n' roll showmanship" and "flamboyant Chuck Berry imitations."

Biography
Walker was born near Clarksdale, Mississippi. Walker Sr. was often referred to by his nickname, "Bilbo", which was passed on to Walker Jr., who was sometimes called "Little Junior Bilbo". Walker began to explore music after being introduced to Ike Turner.

After spending 17 years in Chicago, Illinois with his friend David Porter, Walker moved to the area around Bakersfield, California and started a farm growing such commodities as watermelon and cotton. During this time, he continued to perform at local bars in the California area, as well as in Chicago and Clarksdale when on visits.

In 1997, Walker released his first album, Promised Land, and followed it with two more records, 1998's Rompin' & Stompin' and 2001's Rock the Night. He appeared in the 2015 documentary film I Am the Blues.

Walker died of cancer in California at the age of 80.

Discography
1997 Promised Land - Rooster Blues
1998 Rompin' & Stompin' - Fedora
2001 Rock the Night - Rooster Blues

References

External links
 
 Robert Walker at Delta Boogie
 Robert Walker at Red's Blues Club in Clarksdale

1937 births
2017 deaths
Musicians from Clarksdale, Mississippi
American blues guitarists
African-American male guitarists
Guitarists from Mississippi
Deaths from cancer in California
20th-century American guitarists
20th-century African-American musicians
20th-century American male musicians